Just Men! is an American game show that aired on NBC Daytime from January 3 to April 1, 1983. The show starred Betty White, who won an Emmy award for her work on the show, with Steve Day announcing. It pitted two female contestants who were asked to predict answers to questions posed previously to a panel of seven male celebrities.

The show was created and produced by Rick Rosner, who was producing CHiPs at the time for NBC, and was a joint production of Rosner Television, Century Towers Productions, and Orion Television. This was one of two collaborations among the three entities. Rosner was later responsible for reviving another NBC game show, Hollywood Squares, which he co-produced with Century Towers with Orion distributing.

The general format of the game, in which the contestant determines whether a celebrity answers "yes" or "no" to a question, is similar to Heatter-Quigley's The Celebrity Game, which aired on CBS from 1964 to 1965.

Gameplay
Two female contestants, one usually a returning champion, competed.

The object of the game was for the women to win keys by correctly predicting answers to questions posed previously to a panel of seven celebrities (all of whom were men, hence the name of the show).  One of the keys started a car, which White demonstrated with the actual key at the start of each program before dropping it into a clear plastic box, along with six other keys. The keys slid down a series of slopes inside the box, emerging through an opening at the bottom of the box. White then took all seven keys out of the box, the identity of the ignition key now obscured by the shuffle, and handed one key to each of the panelists.

Round 1
In Round 1, the panel was asked a yes or no question to which at least two celebrities had answered "yes." Starting with the champion, each woman questioned the panel for one minute, using topic-related questions prepared for them in advance. Each contestant then selected a celebrity she thought had answered "yes." The celebrity revealed his answer by opening a folder and placing it in front of him. If the celebrity answered "yes," the contestant won his key and the celebrity was eliminated from further play. The contestants took turns asking questions of the remaining celebrities, choosing until two keys had been claimed.

Round 2
In Round 2, the panel was asked another yes or no question, to which at least two of the remaining celebrities had answered "no." The second round started the same as the first: if the celebrity answered "no," the contestant won his key and the celebrity was eliminated from further play. A wrong prediction, however, resulted in the key being awarded to the contestant's opponent. Each contestant took one turn.

Round 3 (catch-up round)
The contestants took turns asking one of the three remaining celebrities questions in Round 3, the final round, then predicted whether the celebrity said "yes" or "no" to the Round 3 question. The contestant won the celebrity's key if she guessed correctly, along with her choice of one of her opponent's keys; if she guessed wrong, however, she lost both that key and a second key to the other player.

The contestant who won the most keys after all seven keys were claimed won the game and advanced to the bonus round. The loser received a consolation prize for each key she won, and was guaranteed at least one prize.

Bonus round
The champion was allowed to choose one of the keys the first time she won the game, and she was allowed to choose a second if she won all seven keys. The man (or men) attached to the key(s) walked to the car, and the champion tried to start the engine. If the car started, the champion won the car and retired undefeated; if not, she won a consolation prize, and White identified the correct key. The champion then used that key to open the trunk, inside of which was a prop that hinted at the identity of the consolation prize.

The champion was allowed to choose one additional key for each subsequent win, and she was awarded the car and retired if she made it to seven wins without having won the car.

Broadcast history
Just Men! premiered on NBC January 3, 1983, along with two other game shows: Hit Man and a revival of Sale of the Century. The program aired at 12:00noon Eastern/11:00a.m. Central, though some stations such as WRC-TV in Washington, D.C. aired the program on next-day tape delay. Like many game shows in this time slot, Just Men! suffered from low affiliate clearances, as many larger markets aired newscasts at noon by 1983. The show lasted just thirteen weeks, ending its run on April 1, 1983. It was replaced in its time slot by The New Battlestars, which also ended after thirteen weeks.

Just Men! aired opposite Family Feud on ABC nationwide, and The Young and the Restless on CBS outside the Eastern Time Zone. Despite the show's short run, Betty White won a Daytime Emmy Award for Outstanding Game Show Host for Just Men!, becoming the first woman to win the award.

Critical response
Tom Shales of The Washington Post called the show "the litmus test for people who think the TV show that can make them physically ill hasn't been invented." He criticized the nature of questions asked during the show and wrote, "White, a talented light comedian, is terribly demeaned by this role, which has her hobbling about from man to man as they utter answers or remarks that are supposedly uproarious."

Explanatory notes

References

External links
 Betty White: My First 46 Years in Television, Smithsonian Associates
 Betty White page at The Museum of Broadcast Communications
 

1983 American television series debuts
1983 American television series endings
1980s American game shows
Panel games
NBC original programming
Television series by MGM Television
English-language television shows